The Montana Lottery is run by the government of Montana. It is a member of the Multi-State Lottery Association (MUSL). The Montana Lottery's portfolio consists of scratch tickets, plus Mega Millions, Powerball, Lotto America, Montana Millionaire, Lucky for Life, Big Sky Bonus, Montana Sports Action, Treasure Play and Montana Cash.

The Montana Lottery was created by referendum in 1986. It passed by a wide margin and the Montana Lottery opened for business in June 1987. Since then, it has paid out at least $590 million to players in prizes, and has generated over $259 million for the State of Montana.

In Montana, the minimum age to purchase a lottery ticket is 18.

History
The Montana Lottery was created by citizen referendum and passed on November 4, 1986 by 68.97% of voters.

In 1995 the state legislature passed SB 83, which redirected lottery revenue earmarked for the Superintendent of Public Instruction to the General Fund as "part of a larger bill simplifying revenue allocations throughout state government."

On August 31, 2008, the Montana Lottery began fantasy sports wagering, called Montana Sports Action, which is offered under the authority of MCA 23-4, a law passed by the Montana Legislature in 2007 to help the Board of Horse Racing increase purses in Montana. The Board of Horse Racing may also use the funds raised in other ways to stimulate horse racing in Montana. The law requires that 74% of the money wagered be returned to players in prize payouts. The remaining 26% is shared between the establishments offering Montana Sports Action, the Board of Horse Racing, and the Montana Lottery. (Sports betting in the US also was legal in Delaware, Nevada, and Oregon prior to the Supreme Court ruling the Professional & Amateur Sports Protection Act (PASPA) unconstitutional in May 2018, opening the door for other states to legalize sports betting.)

Current draw games

In-house draw games

Montana Cash
Montana Cash is played Wednesdays and Saturdays. It draws 5 numbers from 1 through 45. Players get two games for $1. The jackpot starts at $40,000.

Big Sky Bonus
Big Sky Bonus draws daily at 7:30 p.m. Mountain Time. Tickets may be purchased up to two minutes before the drawing. Players can choose to play up to seven consecutive drawings.

Lotto America
Lotto America draws on Wednesdays and Saturdays at 8:59 p.m. mountain time. The jackpot starts at a guaranteed $2 million and grows each time the jackpot is not won. For an additional $1 per play, All Star Bonus provides the opportunity to multiply any Lotto America prize you win (excluding the jackpot) up to five times.

Lucky for Life

Lucky for Life is a lottery drawing game available in 23 states and the District Of Columbia. Players select 5 numbers from 1 through 48, and a green "Lucky Ball" numbered from 1 through 18. Lucky for Life, which began as a Connecticut-only game, Lucky-4-Life, has a top prize of $1,000-per-day-for-life, and a second prize of $25,000-per-year for life. ("Lifetime" winners can choose cash in lieu of the periodic payments.)

Mega Millions

On September 6, 1996, six lotteries began the-then The Big Game; it became Mega Millions in May 2002. Its jackpots begin at $20 million (annuitized with cash option.) Mega Millions draws 5 white balls numbered 1 through 70, and 1 gold-colored Mega Ball numbered 1 through 25.

Most lotteries with either Mega Millions or Powerball prior to January 31, 2010 added the other game on that date. The Montana Lottery added Mega Millions on March 1, 2010, becoming the first lottery to add the "other" game after the official cross-selling expansion about a month prior. As with all Mega Millions members (except for California), Montana offers Mega Millions' multiplier, called Megaplier; it multiplies all non-jackpot prizes by up to 5x. A second-prize wager with "Megaplier" can win $5 million cash.

Powerball
Since 1989, the Montana Lottery has been a member of MUSL. Powerball began in April 1992. Powerball's jackpots are at least $20 million. It is also drawn Monday, Wednesday, and Saturday nights. Powerball draws 5 white balls from 1 to 69 and 1 red Powerball from 1 to 26. Powerball also has an optional multiplier, PowerPlay, which multiplies a non-jackpot prize by 2x to 5x.

References

External links
Montana Lottery web site
Montana Sports Action

State lotteries of the United States
Economy of Montana
State agencies of Montana
1986 establishments in Montana